The name Irwin has been used for seven tropical cyclones in the Eastern Pacific Ocean.
 Tropical Storm Irwin (1981)
 Tropical Storm Irwin (1987)
 Tropical Storm Irwin (1993)
 Tropical Storm Irwin (1999)
 Tropical Storm Irwin (2005) – No threat to land.
 Hurricane Irwin (2011) – Category 2 hurricane, no threat to land.
 Hurricane Irwin (2017) – Category 1 hurricane, no threat to land.

Pacific hurricane set index articles